is a district located in Nara Prefecture, Japan.

As of 2003, the district has an estimated population of 134,816 and a density of 1,886.07 persons per km2. The total area is 71.48 km2.

Towns and villages
Kanmaki
Kawai
Kōryō
Ōji

Mergers
On October 1, 2004 the towns of Shinjō and Taima merged to form the new city of Katsuragi.

Districts in Nara Prefecture